In My Eyes is the sixth studio album by American country music artist John Conlee. It was released in 1983 via MCA Records. The album includes the singles "I'm Only in It for the Love", "In My Eyes", "As Long as I'm Rockin' with You" and "Way Back"

Track listing

Chart performance

References

1983 albums
John Conlee albums
MCA Records